Unbihexium, also known as element 126 or eka-plutonium, is the hypothetical chemical element with atomic number 126 and placeholder symbol Ubh. Unbihexium and Ubh are the temporary IUPAC name and symbol, respectively, until the element is discovered, confirmed, and a permanent name is decided upon. In the periodic table, unbihexium is expected to be a g-block superactinide and the eighth element in the 8th period. Unbihexium has attracted attention among nuclear physicists, especially in early predictions targeting properties of superheavy elements, for 126 may be a magic number of protons near the center of an island of stability, leading to longer half-lives, especially for 310Ubh or 354Ubh which may also have magic numbers of neutrons.

Early interest in possible increased stability led to the first attempted synthesis of unbihexium in 1971 and searches for it in nature in subsequent years. Despite several reported observations, more recent studies suggest that these experiments were insufficiently sensitive; hence, no unbihexium has been found naturally or artificially. Predictions of the stability of unbihexium vary greatly among different models; some suggest the island of stability may instead lie at a lower atomic number, closer to copernicium and flerovium.

Unbihexium is predicted to be a chemically active superactinide, exhibiting a variety of oxidation states from +1 to +8, and possibly being a heavier congener of plutonium. An overlap in energy levels of the 5g, 6f, 7d, and 8p orbitals is also expected, which complicates predictions of chemical properties for this element.

Introduction

History

Synthesis attempts
The first and only attempt to synthesize unbihexium, which was unsuccessful, was performed in 1971 at CERN (European Organization for Nuclear Research) by René Bimbot and John M. Alexander using the hot fusion reaction:

 +  → * → no atoms

High-energy (13-15 MeV) alpha particles were observed and taken as possible evidence for the synthesis of unbihexium. Subsequent unsuccessful experiments with higher sensitivity suggest that the 10 mb sensitivity of this experiment was too low; hence, the formation of unbihexium nuclei in this reaction was deemed highly unlikely.

Possible natural occurrence
A study in 1976 by a group of American researchers from several universities proposed that primordial superheavy elements, mainly livermorium, unbiquadium, unbihexium, and unbiseptium, with half-lives exceeding 500 million years could be a cause of unexplained radiation damage (particularly radiohalos) in minerals. This prompted many researchers to search for them in nature from 1976 to 1983. A group led by Tom Cahill, a professor at the University of California at Davis, claimed in 1976 that they had detected alpha particles and X-rays with the right energies to cause the damage observed, supporting the presence of these elements, especially unbihexium. Others claimed that none had been detected, and questioned the proposed characteristics of primordial superheavy nuclei. In particular, they cited that the magic number N = 228 necessary for enhanced stability would create a neutron-excessive nucleus in unbihexium that might not be beta-stable, although several calculations suggest that 354Ubh may indeed be stable against beta decay. This activity was also proposed to be caused by nuclear transmutations in natural cerium, raising further ambiguity upon this claimed observation of superheavy elements.

Unbihexium has received particular attention in these investigations, for its speculated location in the island of stability may increase its abundance relative to other superheavy elements. Any naturally occurring unbihexium is predicted to be chemically similar to plutonium and may exist with primordial 244Pu in the rare earth mineral bastnäsite. In particular, plutonium and unbihexium are predicted to have similar valence configurations, leading to the existence of unbihexium in the +4 oxidation state. Therefore, should unbihexium occur naturally, it may be possible to extract it using similar techniques for the accumulation of cerium and plutonium. Likewise, unbihexium could also exist in monazite with other lanthanides and actinides that would be chemically similar. Recent doubt on the existence of primordial 244Pu casts uncertainty on these predictions, however, as the nonexistence (or minimal existence) of plutonium in bastnäsite will inhibit possible identification of unbihexium as its heavier congener.

The possible extent of primordial superheavy elements on Earth today is uncertain. Even if they are confirmed to have caused the radiation damage long ago, they might now have decayed to mere traces, or even be completely gone. It is also uncertain if such superheavy nuclei may be produced naturally at all, as spontaneous fission is expected to terminate the r-process responsible for heavy element formation between mass number 270 and 290, well before elements such as unbihexium may be formed.

A recent hypothesis tries to explain the spectrum of Przybylski's Star by naturally occurring flerovium, unbinilium, and unbihexium.

Naming
Using the 1979 IUPAC recommendations, the element should be temporarily called unbihexium (symbol Ubh) until it is discovered, the discovery is confirmed, and a permanent name chosen. Although widely used in the chemical community on all levels, from chemistry classrooms to advanced textbooks, the recommendations are mostly ignored among scientists who work theoretically or experimentally on superheavy elements, who call it "element 126", with the symbol E126, (126), or 126. Some researchers have also referred to unbihexium as eka-plutonium, a name derived from the system Dmitri Mendeleev used to predict unknown elements, though such an extrapolation might not work for g-block elements with no known congeners, and eka-plutonium would instead refer to element 146 or 148 when the term is meant to denote the element directly below plutonium.

Prospects for future synthesis
Every element from mendelevium onward was produced in fusion-evaporation reactions, culminating in the discovery of the heaviest known element, oganesson, in 2002 and most recently tennessine in 2010. These reactions approached the limit of current technology; for example, the synthesis of tennessine required 22 milligrams of 249Bk and an intense 48Ca beam for six months. The intensity of beams in superheavy element research cannot exceed 1012 projectiles per second without damaging the target and detector, and producing larger quantities of increasingly rare and unstable actinide targets is impractical.
Consequently, future experiments must be done at facilities such as the superheavy element factory (SHE-factory) at the Joint Institute for Nuclear Research (JINR) or RIKEN, which will allow experiments to run for longer time periods with increased detection capabilities and enable otherwise inaccessible reactions. Even so, it will likely be a great challenge to synthesize elements beyond unbinilium (120) or unbiunium (121), given their short predicted half-lives and low predicted cross sections.

It has been suggested that fusion-evaporation will not be feasible to reach unbihexium. As 48Ca cannot be used for synthesis of elements beyond atomic number 118 or possibly 119, the only alternatives are increasing the atomic number of the projectile or studying symmetric or near-symmetric reactions. One calculation suggests that the cross section for producing unbihexium from 249Cf and 64Ni may be as low as nine orders of magnitude lower than the detection limit; such results are also suggested by the non-observation of unbinilium and unbibium in reactions with heavier projectiles and experimental cross section limits. If Z = 126 represents a closed proton shell, compound nuclei may have greater survival probability and the use of 64Ni may be more feasible for producing nuclei with 122 < Z < 126, especially for compound nuclei near the closed shell at N = 184. However, the cross section still might not exceed 1 fb, posing an obstacle that may only be overcome with more sensitive equipment.

Predicted properties

Nuclear stability and isotopes 

Extensions of the nuclear shell model predicted that the next magic numbers after Z = 82 and N = 126 (corresponding to 208Pb, the heaviest stable nucleus) were Z = 126 and N = 184, making 310Ubh the next candidate for a doubly magic nucleus. These speculations led to interest in the stability of unbihexium as early as 1957; Gertrude Scharff Goldhaber was one of the first physicists to predict a region of increased stability in the vicinity of, and possibly centered at, unbihexium. This notion of an "island of stability" comprising longer-lived superheavy nuclei was popularized by University of California professor Glenn Seaborg in the 1960s.

In this region of the periodic table, N = 184 and N = 228 have been suggested as closed neutron shells, and various atomic numbers, including Z = 126, have been proposed as closed proton shells. The extent of stabilizing effects in the region of unbihexium is uncertain, however, due to predictions of shifting or weakening of the proton shell closure and possible loss of double magicity. More recent research predicts the island of stability to instead be centered at beta-stable isotopes of copernicium (291Cn and 293Cn) or flerovium (Z = 114), which would place unbihexium well above the island and result in short half-lives regardless of shell effects.

Earlier models suggested the existence of long-lived nuclear isomers resistant to spontaneous fission in the region near 310Ubh, with half-lives on the order of millions or billions of years. However, more rigorous calculations as early as the 1970s yielded contradictory results; it is now believed that the island of stability is not centered at 310Ubh, and thus will not enhance the stability of this nuclide. Instead, 310Ubh is thought to be very neutron-deficient and susceptible to alpha decay and spontaneous fission in less than a microsecond, and it may even lie at or beyond the proton drip line. A 2016 calculation on the decay properties of 288–339Ubh upholds these predictions; the isotopes lighter than 313Ubh (including 310Ubh) may indeed lie beyond the drip line and decay by proton emission, 313–327Ubh will alpha decay, possibly reaching flerovium and livermorium isotopes, and heavier isotopes will decay by spontaneous fission. This study and a quantum tunneling model predict alpha-decay half-lives under a microsecond for isotopes lighter than 318Ubh, rendering them impossible to identify experimentally. Hence, the isotopes 318–327Ubh may be synthesized and detected, and may even constitute a region of increased stability against fission around N ~ 198 with half-lives up to several seconds, though such a region of increased stability is completely absent in other models.

A "sea of instability" defined by very low fission barriers (caused by greatly increasing Coulomb repulsion in superheavy elements) and consequently fission half-lives on the order of 10−18 seconds is predicted across various models. Although the exact limit of stability for half-lives over one microsecond varies, stability against fission is strongly dependent on the N = 184 and N = 228 shell closures and rapidly drops off immediately beyond the influence of the shell closure. Such an effect may be reduced, however, if nuclear deformation in intermediate isotopes may lead to a shift in magic numbers; a similar phenomenon was observed in the deformed doubly magic nucleus 270Hs. This shift could then lead to longer half-lives, perhaps on the order of days, for isotopes such as 342Ubh that would also lie on the beta-stability line. A second island of stability for spherical nuclei may exist in unbihexium isotopes with many more neutrons, centered at 354Ubh and conferring additional stability in N = 228 isotones near the beta-stability line. Originally, a short half-life of 39 milliseconds was predicted for 354Ubh toward spontaneous fission, though a partial alpha half-life for this isotope was predicted to be 18 years. More recent analysis suggests that this isotope may have a half-life on the order of 100 years should the closed shells have strong stabilizing effects, placing it at the peak of an island of stability. It may also be possible that 354Ubh is not doubly magic, as the Z = 126 shell is predicted to be relatively weak, or in some calculations, completely nonexistent. This suggests that any relative stability in unbihexium isotopes would be only due to neutron shell closures that may or may not have a stabilizing effect at Z = 126.

Chemical
Unbihexium is expected to be the sixth member of a superactinide series. It may have similarities to plutonium, as both elements have eight valence electrons over a noble gas core. In the superactinide series, the Aufbau principle is expected to break down due to relativistic effects, and an overlap of the energy levels of the 7d, 8p, and especially 5g and 6f orbitals is expected, which renders predictions of chemical and atomic properties of these elements very difficult. The ground state electron configuration of unbihexium is thus predicted to be [Og] 5g2 6f3 8s2 8p1 or 5g1 6f4 8s2 8p1, in contrast to [Og] 5g6 8s2 derived from Aufbau.

As with the other early superactinides, it is predicted that unbihexium will be able to lose all eight valence electrons in chemical reactions, rendering a variety of oxidation states up to +8 possible. The +4 oxidation state is predicted to be most common, in addition to +2 and +6. Unbihexium should be able to form the tetroxide UbhO4 and hexahalides UbhF6 and UbhCl6, the latter with a fairly strong bond dissociation energy of 2.68 eV. Calculations suggest that a diatomic UbhF molecule will feature a bond between the 5g orbital in unbihexium and the 2p orbital in fluorine, thus characterizing unbihexium as an element whose 5g electrons should actively participate in bonding. It is also predicted that the Ubh6+ (in particular, in UbhF6) and Ubh7+ ions will have the electron configurations [Og] 5g2 and [Og] 5g1, respectively, in contrast to the [Og] 6f1 configuration seen in Ubt4+ and Ubq5+ that bears more resemblance to their actinide homologs. The activity of 5g electrons may influence the chemistry of superactinides such as unbihexium in new ways that are difficult to predict, as no known elements have electrons in a g orbital in the ground state.

See also
 Island of stability: flerovium–unbinilium–unbihexium

Notes

References

Bibliography
 pp. 030001-1–030001-17, pp. 030001-18–030001-138, Table I. The NUBASE2016 table of nuclear and decay properties
 
 
 
 

 
126